Lilian Calmejane (born 6 December 1992) is a French cyclist, who currently rides for UCI WorldTeam . He is best known for winning stages at the Tour de France in 2017 and the Vuelta a España in 2016.

Career

In 2017, the second win of his career came at the Étoile de Bessèges where he won stage 3 and the overall race. At the start of March, Calmejane won the Mountains classification at Paris–Nice. His great form continued at the Settimana Internazionale di Coppi e Bartali where he won stage 4 and the overall race. He finished off his strong spring with a stage win and the overall win at the Circuit Cycliste Sarthe – Pays de la Loire. In June, he was named in the startlist for the Tour de France.

In February 2018, Calmejane won La Drôme Classic, before he triumphed at Paris–Camembert in April.

Major results

2014
 4th Overall Ronde de l'Isard Ariege
1st Stages 2 & 3 (TTT)
2015
 1st  Overall Le Triptyque des Monts et Châteaux
1st Stage 2
 5th Overall Tour de Bretagne
1st Stage 3
 8th Overall Tour Alsace
1st  Mountains classification
2016
 1st Stage 4 Vuelta a España
 3rd Overall Tour La Provence
 8th Overall La Méditerranéenne
1st  Young rider classification
 8th Tour du Finistère
 10th La Drôme Classic
2017
 1st  Overall Settimana Internazionale di Coppi e Bartali
1st  Points classification
1st Stage 4
 1st  Overall Étoile de Bessèges
1st Stage 3
 1st  Overall Circuit de la Sarthe
1st Stage 3
 Tour de France
1st Stage 8
Held  after Stage 8
 Combativity award Stages 3 & 8
 1st  Mountains classification, Paris–Nice
 3rd Grand Prix d'Ouverture La Marseillaise
 5th Overall Tour du Haut Var
 6th Overall Tour du Limousin
 9th Classic Sud-Ardèche
 10th Overall Boucles de la Mayenne
 10th Overall Tour du Poitou-Charentes
2018
 1st Paris–Camembert
 1st La Drôme Classic
 3rd Classic Sud-Ardèche
 3rd Grand Prix Cycliste la Marseillaise
 5th Overall Tour La Provence
 6th Overall Etoile de Bessèges
 8th Overall Tour du Limousin
 8th GP Miguel Induráin
 9th Overall Tour de l'Ain
 10th Tour du Finistère
2019
 1st Classic Sud-Ardèche
 1st  Mountains classification, Tour de la Provence
 2nd Overall Tour du Limousin
1st Stage 1
 4th Overall Arctic Race of Norway
 5th Grand Prix de Wallonie
 5th Tro-Bro Léon
 6th Grand Prix La Marseillaise
2020
 1st  Mountains classification, Route d'Occitanie
 5th Overall Étoile de Bessèges
 10th La Drôme Classic
2021
 5th Classic Loire Atlantique
 8th Grand Prix La Marseillaise
 10th Grand Prix du Morbihan
2022
 7th Tour du Jura
 8th Route Adélie
 9th Faun-Ardèche Classic
2023
 4th Trofeo Serra de Tramuntana

Grand Tour general classification results timeline

References

External links

 
 
 

Sportspeople from Albi
1992 births
Living people
French male cyclists
French Vuelta a España stage winners
French Tour de France stage winners
Cyclists from Occitania (administrative region)